Laurie Faria Stolarz is an American author of young adult fiction novels featuring teenage protagonists, best known of which are the series of books beginning with Blue is for Nightmares.

Early life and education
Stolarz grew up in Salem, Massachusetts. She attended Merrimack College and later Emerson College, both in Massachusetts.

Career
Stolarz found sales success with her first novel, Blue is for Nightmares, and followed it up with three more titles in the series, White is for Magic, Silver is for Secrets, and Red is for Remembrance. The four novels in the "BIFN" series have sold over 500,000 copies collectively. Stolarz also announced a graphic novel entry into the series titled Black is for Beginnings, which she published in summer 2009.

Stolarz published Bleed in September 2006 and a companion novel, Project 17, in December 2007. Project 17 is set at the former Danvers State Hospital, which was demolished that same year. 

On June 10, 2022, it was announced that a Blue Is for Nightmares podcast is being produced, adapted by Stephanie Wu. It is a joint production between The Hideaway Entertainment and Fictionz.  Debbie Moon will also adapt the novels into a television series.

Bibliography

 Blue is for Nightmares series
Blue is for Nightmares, Llewellyn Publications, November 2003, 
White is for Magic, Llewellyn Publications, May 2004, 
Silver is for Secrets, Llewellyn Publications, January 2005, 
Red is for Remembrance, Llewellyn Publications, August 2005, 
 A box set of these four novels was published as The Blue is for Nightmares Collection by Llewellyn's new young adult imprint, Flux, in September 2006
Black is for Beginnings, Flux, September 2009,  (graphic novel continuation)
 Bleed, Hyperion, September 2006, 
Project 17, Hyperion, December 2007, 
Touch series
Deadly Little Secret, Hyperion, December 2008, 
Deadly Little Lies, Hyperion, November 2009, 
Deadly Little Games, Hyperion, December 28, 2010 
Deadly Little Voices, Hyperion, December 6, 2011, 
Deadly Little Lessons, Hyperion, December 18, 2012, 
Shattered: The Amanda Project #3, HarperTeen, December 27, 2011, 
Dark House series
Welcome to the Dark House, Hyperion, July 22, 2014, 
Return to the Dark House, Hyperion, July 21, 2015, 
Shutter, Hyperion, October 18, 2016, 
Jane Anonymous, Wednesday Books, January 7, 2020,

References

External links
 Official Laurie Stolarz Website
 Laurie Stolarz page on MySpace
 Laurie Stolarz LiveJournal blog
 https://www.facebook.com/#/profile.php?id=597050025&ref=nf

Living people
Year of birth missing (living people)
21st-century American novelists
21st-century American women writers
American fantasy writers
American young adult novelists
Emerson College alumni
Novelists from Massachusetts
Women writers of young adult literature
Writers from Salem, Massachusetts